Night Mail is a 1935 British thriller film. It is not to be confused with the 1936 documentary Night Mail.

Plot
On the overnight Aberdeen mail train, demented violinist Mancini (Henry Oscar) attempts to murder judge Sir Jacob March (C.M. Hallard) for refusing to grant him a divorce.

Cast
Henry Oscar as Mancini
Hope Davy as	Wendy March
C. M. Hallard as Sir Jacob March
Richard Bird as	Billy
Jane Carr as	Lady Angela Savage
Garry Marsh as	Capt. Ronnie Evans
Edmund Breon as 	Lord Ticehurst

Critical reception
TV Guide rated the film two out of four stars, and wrote, "This thriller is helped along by its quick pacing and unusual assortment of quirky characters. The sort of underhanded conniver portrayed here by Oscar was his specialty.

References

External links
Night Mail at IMDb

1935 films
British thriller films
1930s thriller films
British black-and-white films
1930s British films